The 2016 San Francisco season is the inaugural season of San Francisco Rush.

2016 season

Ladder

Ladder progression

Rugby union in San Francisco
2016 in San Francisco
2016 in sports in California